How to Be a Person Like Other People is the eighth studio album by English rock band Embrace. It was released on 26 August 2022 through Embrace's own record label, Mobetta.

Recording
Richard McNamara produced and mixed the album at Magnetic North Studios in Halifax, West Yorkshire, before it was mastered by Nick Watson at Fluid Mastering.

Track listing 
All songs written by Danny and Richard McNamara, except where noted.

Personnel
Personnel per booklet.

Embrace
 Danny McNamara – lead vocals, artwork concept
 Richard McNamara – guitar, keyboards, vocals, production, mixing, artwork concept
 Mickey Dale – keyboards, backing vocals, string arrangements, artwork concept
 Mike Heaton – drums, percussion, backing vocals, artwork concept
 Steve Firth – bass, artwork concept

Additional musicians
 Nicole Hope Smith – additional backing vocals
 Ellen Benn – additional backing vocals
 James Smith – additional backing vocals
 Ella McNamara – additional backing vocals

Production and design
 Nick Watson – mastering
 Nathan McGrory – sleeve design, layout, artwork concept
 Neil Chapman – sleeve artwork photography

Charts

References

2022 albums
Embrace (English band) albums